The Oakville Assembly Complex is a Ford Motor Company of Canada automobile factory in Oakville, Ontario, spanning 487 acres. This landmark occupies the same site as, and combines, the former Ontario Truck plant and Oakville Assembly Plant. Clearly visible from the Queen Elizabeth Way and the Lakeshore West GO Train line, it relies on the nearby railway service to transport parts and vehicles throughout the country.

History
The first car plant on this site opened in 1953, and produced nearly all of the vehicles for Ford in Canada until 1966.  It was the site of production for the company's minivans but was renovated with a $1 billion investment to produce crossover CUVs by 2006. Phase one was completed with the launch of the Edge and the MKX in the fall of 2006 and phase two was completed by spring of 2008 with the launch of the Ford Flex. In addition to the human workers, 440 robots help to assist in the production of new automobiles. The company has two different shifts that last from 8–10 hours (depending on the economy and the demand for new automobiles). As of 2002, up to 211,000 new vehicles can be manufactured and assembled within a typical year.

In 2013, Ford announced an investment of C$700-million to upgrade the plant to manufacture vehicles of global platform with the assistance from the governments of Canada and Ontario of C$140-million worth to the project. The plant assembled 255,924 vehicles in 2012, and 258,358 vehicles in 2013.

Ford ended the production of the Lincoln MKT in October 2019 and the Ford Flex the following month, the company laid off 450 of its 4,200 plant workers in early 2020.

The plant is planned to produce electric vehicles and assemble batteries, starting from 2025, after a major retooling from 2024. Government of Canada and the province of Ontario are responsible to contribute a total of C$500 million.

Products made

Current
Ford Edge (2007–present)
Lincoln Nautilus (2019–present)

Past
Monarch Turnpike Cruiser (1957)
Edsel Citation (1958)
Edsel Pacer (1958)
Edsel Corsair (1958–1959)
Edsel Ranger (1958–1959)
Frontenac (1960)
Mercury Comet (1962–1967)
Ford F-Series (1965-2004)
Ford Custom 500 (1973–1981)
Ford LTD (1975–1982)
Mercury Lynx (1981–1987)
Ford Escort (1981–1990)
Ford Tempo (1984–1994)
Mercury Topaz (1984–1994)
Ford Windstar (1995–2003)
Ford Freestar (2004–2007)
Mercury Monterey (2004–2007)
Lincoln MKX (2007–2018)
Ford Flex (2009–2019)
Lincoln MKT (2010–2019)

See also
 List of Ford factories

References

External links

1953 establishments in Ontario
Ford factories
Motor vehicle assembly plants in Canada
Buildings and structures in Oakville, Ontario